Cibusoides is a genus of benthonic foraminifera.

References

External links 

Heterolepidae
Rotaliida genera